Victor Trotsyuk (born 27 May 1984) is a Belarusian retired footballer. He played for clubs such as FC Slavia Mozyr and FC Dinamo Brest in the Belarusian Premier League.

Honours
Dinamo Brest
Belarusian Cup winner: 2006–07

External links
 
 

1984 births
Living people
Sportspeople from Brest, Belarus
Belarusian footballers
Association football forwards
FC Slavia Mozyr players
FC Dynamo Brest players
FC Bereza-2010 players
FC Volna Pinsk players
FC Minsk players
FC Baranovichi players